Matsuzawa (written: 松沢 or 松澤 lit. "pine tree swamp") is a Japanese surname. Notable people with the surname include:

, Japanese swimmer
, Japanese politician
, Japanese primatologist
Yuki Matsuzawa (born 1960), Japanese classical pianist
, Japanese singer

Japanese-language surnames